Llangibby can refer to:

Llangybi, Monmouthshire (also spelled Llangibby), a town in Wales.

Ships named after this town, or its castle:

Llangibby (ship)
MV Llangibby Castle